This article lists the prime ministers of the Federation of Bosnia and Herzegovina, the head of the Government of the Federation of Bosnia and Herzegovina.

The prime minister is nominated by the President of the Federation of Bosnia and Herzegovina, and appointed by the Parliament of the Federation of Bosnia and Herzegovina. As head of the government, the prime minister has no authority for appointing ministers, and his role is that of a coordinator. Ministers are appointed in his or her stead by the majority-parties according to ethnic and entity representation rules, so that a deputy minister must not be of same ethnicity as the respective minister.

Fadil Novalić is the 9th and current prime minister of the Federation of Bosnia and Herzegovina. He took office on 31 March 2015, following the 2014 general election.

Prime ministers of the Federation of Bosnia and Herzegovina (1994–present)

See also
List of presidents of the Federation of Bosnia and Herzegovina

References

External links
World Statesmen –  Federation of Bosnia-Hercegovina

Prime ministers
Federation of Bosnia and Herzegovina
Prime ministers of the Federation of Bosnia and Herzegovina